Paracorynanthe is a genus of flowering plants belonging to the family Rubiaceae.

Its native range is Madagascar.

Species
Species:

Paracorynanthe antankarana 
Paracorynanthe uropetala

References

Hymenodictyeae
Rubiaceae genera
Taxa named by René Paul Raymond Capuron